Typhoon Soudelor, known in the Philippines as Typhoon Hanna, was the third most intense tropical cyclone worldwide in 2015 after Hurricane Patricia and Cyclone Pam as well as the strongest tropical cyclone of the 2015 Pacific typhoon season. Soudelor had severe impacts in the Northern Mariana Islands, Taiwan, and eastern China, resulting in 40 confirmed fatalities. Lesser effects were felt in Japan, South Korea and the Philippines. The thirteenth named storm of the annual typhoon season, Soudelor formed as a tropical depression near Pohnpei on July 29. The system strengthened slowly at first before entering a period of rapid intensification on August 2. Soudelor made landfall on Saipan later that day, causing extensive damage. Steady weakening ensued thereafter as the storm moved generally west-northwest. Soudelor made landfall over Hualien, Taiwan, late on August 7 and emerged over in the Taiwan Strait early the next day. The typhoon soon moved inland over eastern China and degraded to a tropical depression by August 9.

Soudelor was the second worst storm to strike Saipan in the Northern Mariana Islands in nearly 30 years (following Typhoon Yutu of 2018). Hundreds of homes were damaged or destroyed and power was expected to take a month to restore. Two people died in Guam due to rip currents. In Taiwan, torrential rains and destructive winds caused widespread damage and disruptions. A record-breaking 4.85 million households lost power on the island. At least 8 people died and 420 others sustained injury there; a ninth person died in the storm's aftermath. Portions of eastern China saw their heaviest rains in 100 years, resulting in deadly floods and landslides. Typhoon Soudelor killed 45 people in eastern China after parts of the country were hit by the heaviest rains in a century. Total economic losses were counted to be ¥24.627 billion (US$3.97 billion).

Meteorological history

The system featured a developing low level circulation accompanied by deep convection. Moving generally west under the influence of a subtropical ridge, the disturbance gradually organized amid favorable environmental conditions. A tropical upper tropospheric trough (TUTT) cell enhanced upper-level outflow, offsetting the negative effects of moderate wind shear; high sea surface temperatures and ocean heat content provided ample energy for further development. At 14:30 UTC on July 29, the JTWC issued a Tropical Cyclone Formation Alert for the system. Several hours later, the Japan Meteorological Agency (JMA) began monitoring the system as a weak tropical depression; the agency began full advisories on the system at 00:00 UTC on July 30. The JTWC followed suit later that day, designating the system as Tropical Depression 13W. The cyclone achieved tropical storm intensity by 12:00 UTC, at which time it was assigned the name Soudelor, a title of legendary rulers in the Pohnpeian language. A central dense overcast developed over the circulation center shortly thereafter.

Some structural degradation took place on July 31 owing to subsidence from a TUTT cell to the north. Following a retreat of the TUTT cell northward, Soudelor's convective structure improved with well-defined banding features wrapping into the circulation by August 1. Therefore, the JMA upgraded Soudelor to a severe tropical storm by 18:00 UTC. Rapid intensification ensued on August 2 as the storm approached the Northern Mariana Islands with both agencies classifying Soudelor as a typhoon. The typhoon developed an unusually small eye only  in diameter, among the smallest ever observed in a tropical cyclone. At 14:54 UTC, Soudelor made landfall along the southern coast of Saipan.

After undergoing an eyewall replacement cycle, Soudelor continued rapid intensification, reaching peak intensity on August 3. Intensity leveled off thereafter, and after maintaining Category 5 intensity for 24 hours, Soudelor was downgraded to a Category 4 super typhoon late on August 4. On August 5, PAGASA reported that the Typhoon Soudelor entered the Philippine Area of Responsibility assigning the name Hanna. Soudelor weakened further to a Category 2-equivalent typhoon and stayed at that intensity for a day. On August 7, the typhoon reintensified to reach a secondary peak as a Category 3-equivalent typhoon, and later that day, Typhoon Soudelor made landfall over Xiulin, Hualien in Taiwan at 20:40 UTC on August 7 (04:40 TST on August 8), and it arrived in the Taiwan Strait from Taixi, Yunlin around 03:00 UTC (11:00 TST) on August 8. Around 14:10 UTC (22:10 CST) on the same day, Soudelor made landfall over Xiuyu District, Putian, Fujian in China as a Category 1-equivalent typhoon.

Impact

Mariana Islands

Typhoon Soudelor passed directly over Saipan on August 2 as an intensifying Category 2 equivalent storm according to the JTWC, causing widespread damage on the island. The winds downed numerous trees and power lines, leaving much of the island without power and rendering roads impassible. In some areas, cars were flipped over by the force of the wind. The island's power plant lost part of its roof and was flooded. Damage to the island's electrical infrastructure was tremendous, with 150 power poles and 114 transformers damaged or destroyed. A total of 464 residents sought refuge in public shelters. Acting Governor Ralph DLG Torres declared "a state of disaster and significant emergency". Dr. Philip Dauterman of the Commonwealth Health Center in Saipan likened damage to that caused by Typhoon Pongsona which struck Guam in December 2002. In addition, John Hirsh from the American Red Cross said that Soudelor is the most damaging cyclone to hit Saipan since Typhoon Kim in 1986 struck the island nearly thirty years prior.

Initial assessments by the Emergency Operations Center indicate that 384 homes were destroyed. A separate assessment by the American Red Cross showed 808 homes affected. Of this total, 158 were destroyed, 296 sustained major damage, and 354 were affected or sustained minor damage. Total damage exceeded US$21 million (2015 USD) on Saipan. Forty people were injured across the island. On August 8 and 9, two people drowned in separate rip current incidents in western Guam.

The local power company, Commonwealth Utilities Corp., stated they only had 77 replacement power poles and no transformers. Repairs to the electric grid, water supply network, and wastewater systems were expected to take three to four weeks. Three Mobil gas stations re-opened on August 4 for first responders and emergency services. Relief supplies from Guam and Hawaii were sent to Saipan that day. Members of the Guam National Guard, Guam Power Authority, and the Coast Guard also provided assistance. On August 6, United States President Barack Obama declared the Northern Mariana Islands a federal disaster area, allowing residents to receive government aid. Saipan was granted individual assistance while Tinian and Rota received public assistance. By September, the Federal Emergency Management Agency approved US$25.9 million in aid to residents of Saipan.

Japan

Prior to striking Taiwan, the circulation of Typhoon Soudelor battered Japan's southern Ryukyu Islands with typhoon-force winds. Farther north at Kadena Air Base on Okinawa Island, gusts reached . Heavy rains accompanied these winds, with Yonaguni reporting  during the storm's passage. Structural impact was relatively minor, mainly confined to damaged roofs on Yonaguni island. Three people sustained minor injuries in the region. Losses to agriculture, forestry, and fisheries across the Yaeyama District reached ¥360 million (US$2.9 million). In Miyako-jima, crops sustained significant damage from salt; relatively little rain coupled with strong winds allowed sea spray to travel farther inland than normal. Preliminary estimates placed losses at ¥94.52 million (US$761,000). On August 10, a family of four was swept out to sea near Irabu-jima by residual swells from the typhoon; three drowned while the fourth, an 8-year-old girl, was rescued.

Taiwan

On August 6, four people in Su'ao, Yilan were swept away while watching waves. One person, a child, survived; two others are confirmed dead, and the fourth is still missing. By August 10, eight fatalities had been confirmed, while four others were reported missing. Additionally, 420 people sustained injuries. All 279 domestic flights were canceled on August 8, as well as at least 37 international flights.

The center of the storm made landfall in eastern Taiwan at 04:40 a.m. local time on August 8. These winds caused Taipei 101's tuned mass damper to sway a record . Rainfall in the Wulai District reached  in 24 hours, the second-highest on record behind Typhoon Matsa in 2005. Twelve-hour accumulations amounted to a record .

At the height of the storm, 4.85 million households lost electricity. This was the largest blackout on record in Taiwan due to a typhoon, surpassing the previous record of 2.79 million after Typhoon Herb in 1996. Water supply to 429,248 homes and land line telephone service to 64,992 homes was cut during the storm. A contaminated Nanshi River suffered a drastic overflow, and soon mixed with the primary water source of the Taipei-Keelung metropolitan area. The river's turbidity reached record levels in just two hours, catching Taipei's Water Department off-guard. The excess water overwhelmed the regional purification system. As a result, the water supply to approximately 5 million households in Taipei was polluted for the next few days. Agricultural damage in Taiwan exceeded NT$3.03 billion (US$94.8 million). The banana crop suffered the greatest impact, with  damaged; losses from the crop reached NT$460.15 million (US$14.3 million). Six windmills of Taipower were destroyed.

Approximately 100 people were listed as missing after contact was lost with Xiaoyi village (Siaoyi) in Wulai District of New Taipei City during the storm on August 8. Reports from firefighters dispatched to search for residents reported that homes in the area had "disappeared" following a large landslide. All residents were later accounted for on August 10.

A soldier was crushed to death while trying to clear debris on August 13.

China
Typhoon Soudelor killed 45 people in eastern China after parts of the country were hit by the heaviest rains in a century. Total economic losses were counted to be ¥24.627 billion (US$3.97 billion).

Making landfall in Fujian around 10:10 p.m. local time on August 8, the storm brought damaging winds to coastal cities in the region. The storm is regarded as the most severe to strike Fujian Province in a decade. Gusts in excess of typhoon force were almost entirely confined to Fujian. Gale-force winds extended into Jiangxi and Zhejiang. Much of East China saw torrential rains from the storm, with accumulations of at least  reported in several provinces. Portions of Zhejiang Province saw 24‑hour rainfall totals with a return period of 100–120 years. Wencheng County recorded  during the same span – the heaviest in 100 years. Country-wide accumulations peaked at  within Wenzhou. Soudelor's merger with a cold front over Anhui and Jiangsu brought torrential rains to the region from August 9–10. The heaviest rains fell in central Jiangsu Province, peaking at  along the central coastline.

Elsewhere

Typhoon Soudelor's proximity to the Philippines prompted PAGASA to issue Public Storm Warning Signal#1, the lowest on a five-tier scale, for Batanes and Cagayan provinces, including the Calayan islands, from August 6–8. Signal #2 was raised for Batanes on August 7. The storm's circulation enhanced the southwest monsoon and brought rains to Luzon and portions of the Western Visayas. Overall impacts were minor, with 58,255 people affected; 45,444 of these people sought refuge in public shelters. Agricultural damage in Batanes were at ₱363,000 (US$7,900).

Hong Kong experienced its hottest day on August 8, since records began, as a result of air descending on the outer fringe of Soudelor. Air pollution was also severe on August 7 and 8 across the entire territory, with readings on Tap Mun reaching level 10.

The typhoon's remnants brought locally heavy rain to parts of South Korea on August 11, with accumulations reaching .

Retirement

Due to the destruction and deaths caused by the storm in the Northern Mariana Islands, Taiwan and China, the name Soudelor was officially retired at the Fourth Joint Session of the ESCAP/WMO Typhoon Committee and WMO/ESCAP Panel on Tropical Cyclones during 2016. In February 2017, they chose the name Saudel to replace Soudelor.

See also

 Tropical cyclones in 2015
 Typhoon Omar
 Typhoon Winnie
 Typhoon Haitang (2005)
 Typhoon Morakot
 Typhoon Soulik (2013)
 Typhoon Haiyan 
 Typhoon Dolphin (2015)
 Typhoon Dujuan (2015)
 Typhoon Nepartak

Notes

References

External links

 JMA General Information of Typhoon Soudelor (1513) from Digital Typhoon

 13W.SOUDELOR from the U.S. Naval Research Laboratory
 Latest humanitarian response information via ReliefWeb

2015 in the Northern Mariana Islands
Soudelor
Soudelor
Soudelor
Soudelor
Soudelor
Soudelor
2015 disasters in China
July 2015 events in Asia
July 2015 events in the United States
August 2015 events
Soudelor